The Yazdegerd Castle is a pre-medieval Sassanid castle in Nakhchivan, Azerbaijan. It is constructed solely of mud. The castle is named after the last Sassanid king, Yazdegerd III (632–651).

Outside of scientific circles the castle is commonly known as Nakhchivangala or Kohnagala. It currently houses a museum.

References

External links
 “Nahkchivangala” Historical-Architectural Museum Complex

Sasanian castles
Castles and fortresses in Azerbaijan
Monuments and memorials in Azerbaijan